Carlos Abumohor Touma (1921 - 2010) was a successful Chilean of Palestinian descent, businessman and investor who was involved in a number of financial activities in the development of the Chilean banking, media and real estate sectors.

Abumohor owned a controlling interest in Chile's second largest media conglomerate, Consorcio Periodístico de Chile S.A. (Copesa). He had been the chairman of the board of directors for one of Chile's largest private banking institutions, Corpbanca S.A., since June 18, 1996. He was chairman for Banco Osorno as well as several other major Chilean companies.

Notes

Chilean businesspeople
Chilean people of Palestinian descent
1921 births
Palestinian investors
Palestinian bankers
Palestinian accountants
Palestinian stockbrokers
Palestinian financial analysts
2010 deaths